Sturt's Lock is a lock on the Regent's Canal, in the London Borough of Islington.

The nearest London Underground station is Old Street on the Northern line.

See also

Canals of the United Kingdom
History of the British canal system

References

Locks on the Regent's Canal
Geography of the London Borough of Islington
Buildings and structures in the London Borough of Islington